Thitinan Pongsudhirak is a Thai political scientist, speaker and Associate Professor at Faculty of Political Science, Chulalongkorn University in Bangkok, where he is the Director of the Institute for Science and International Security (ISIS), Faculty of Political Science. He received his Ph.D. from the London School of Economics, an M.A. from the School of Advanced International Studies (SAIS) of the Johns Hopkins University, and a B.A. from the University of California, Santa Barbara.

He was formerly Deputy Dean for International Affairs at the Faculty of Political Science of Chulalongkorn University. From 1998 to 2005, he has worked for Economist Intelligence Unit. He was a visiting fellow at Stanford Humanity Center, Stanford University in 2010.

References

Thitinan Pongsudhirak
Alumni of the London School of Economics
Living people
Johns Hopkins University alumni
University of California, Santa Barbara alumni
Year of birth missing (living people)
Place of birth missing (living people)
Thitinan Pongsudhirak
Political scientists on Thailand